Stanford Samuels may refer to:

Stanford Samuels Jr. (born 1980), American football cornerback
Stanford Samuels III (born 1999), American football cornerback